Canghali (also Jan Ali, Can Ali, Tatar: Җангали) (1516–1535) was ruler of the Khanate of Qasim in 1519–1532 and then Khanate of Kazan in 1532–1535. He was the son of Qasim khan Shayex Allahiar (Şäyex Allahiär) (r. 1512-15) and younger brother of Qasim khan Shahgali or Shah Ali (r. 1515-19). 

When Shah Ali moved to Kazan Jan Ali took the throne. The Qasim Khanate was a vassal state of Muscovy. Canghali as its ruler had close ties with Muscovy. 

In 1532 Vasili III of Russia defeated Kazan, khan Safagäräy fled and the 16-year-old Canghali was brought in as a pro-Russian ruler of the bigger and generally independent Kazan Khanate. In 1533 Canghali married Söyembika, the daughter of Nogay nobleman. During his reign he was completely manipulated by Bulat Shirin (Bulat Şirin, /boo-LAHT shee-RREEN/) and queen Gawharshat (Gäwhärşat, /geh-w-ha-rr-SHAHT/), widow or sister of Moxammat Amin khan. During 1535 coup of Kazan nobility, he lost the throne and was exiled to Iske Qazan.  Older sources (Howorth) say that he was killed.

See also
List of Qasim Khans
List of Kazan khans

References
Henry Hoyle Howorth, History of the Mongols, 1880, Part 2, pp 433 for Kasimov and 393-400 for Kazan

1516 births
1535 deaths
Qasim Khanate
Khanate of Kazan
16th-century monarchs in Europe

cv:Еналей